is a railway station located in the city of Shinjō, Yamagata Prefecture, Japan, operated by the East Japan Railway Company (JR East).

Lines
Izumita Station is served by the Ōu Main Line, and is located 154.2 rail kilometers from the terminus of the line at Fukushima Station.

Station layout
The station has a single island platform connected to the station building by a footbridge.  The station is unattended.

Platforms

History
Izumita Station opened on July 15, 1913. The station was absorbed into the JR East network upon the privatization of the JNR on April 1, 1987. A new station building was completed in March 2000.

Surrounding area

Izumita Post Office

See also
List of railway stations in Japan

External links
 JR East Station information 

Railway stations in Japan opened in 1913
Railway stations in Yamagata Prefecture
Ōu Main Line
Shinjō, Yamagata